Alfred Vincelette (June 11, 1935 – January 7, 1997) was an American skier. He competed in the Nordic combined event at the 1960 Winter Olympics.

References

External links
 

1935 births
1997 deaths
American male Nordic combined skiers
Olympic Nordic combined skiers of the United States
Nordic combined skiers at the 1960 Winter Olympics
People from West Point, New York
Sportspeople from New York (state)